Kingston's Current is the début album by solo artist Dave House.

Track listing

See also
Split album collaboration with Get Cape. Wear Cape. Fly

References

External links
 Review at Drowned in Sound
 Review at punknews.co.uk
 Review at punktastic.com

Kingston's Current